Nicolae Kirculescu (December 28, 1903, Corabia – December 31, 1985, Recas) was a Romanian composer. He wrote music particularly for the stage and screen. One of his well-known works is Musical Moment for piano and orchestra, the musical theme of a Romanian television science program named Teleenciclopedia.

His compositions also include operetta, musical comedy/canzonetta and instrumental songs.

1903 births
1985 deaths
20th-century composers
Male musical theatre composers
Male television composers
Romanian composers
Romanian musical theatre composers